Reagan Blackburn Dunn (born 1971) is an American politician and lawyer who is a member of the nonpartisan King County Council, representing District 9 in Southeast King County, Washington. District 9 includes the cities of Bellevue, Newcastle, Renton, Maple Valley, Covington, Black Diamond, and Enumclaw, as well as large unincorporated areas.

Prior to his service on the King County Council, Dunn was a federal prosecutor and Presidential appointee in the US Department of Justice. As Senior Counsel to the Director for the Executive Executive Office for United States Attorneys, he helped create Project Safe Neighborhoods, a national initiative against gun violence.

Early life and education 
He is a son of former U.S. Congresswoman Jennifer Dunn, who primarily raised Dunn and his brother. He was named after former U.S. President Ronald Reagan and grew up in Bellevue, Washington. Dunn earned a Bachelor of Arts degree from Arizona State University. In 1998, he earned his Juris Doctor from University of Washington School of Law.

Career 
After graduating from law school, Dunn joined the law firm of Inslee, Doezie & Ryder, P.S. in Bellevue.

In 2001, Dunn was appointed by President George W. Bush to serve in the United States Department of Justice (DOJ) as senior counsel to the director for the Executive Executive Office for United States Attorneys. In this capacity, he was the first national coordinator of Project Safe Neighborhoods, which he helped to author.

He later served as counsel to the assistant attorney general for the Office of Justice Programs and attorney advisor for the Department of Justice's Office of Public Affairs.

Following the September 11 attacks, Dunn was a Department of Justice delegate on President Bush's Task Force on Citizen Preparedness, where he helped form the USA Freedom Corps, Citizen Corps, and the Volunteers in Police Service Program and led efforts to expand the National Neighborhood Watch Program to include terrorism awareness. Dunn also participated in the investigation of Zacharias Moussaoui in the Eastern District of Virginia.

Dunn was appointed to the King County Council in 2005, and elected to the position that same year.

In 2012, he ran for Attorney General of Washington. He received 47 percent of the vote, losing the election to Bob Ferguson.

On November 29, 2021, Dunn launched a campaign for the U.S. House of Representatives in the 8th district against two-term incumbent Democrat Kim Schrier in 2022.

Personal life 
Dunn lives in Covington, Washington, with his wife Ashley. He has two children from a previous marriage.

In 2014, Dunn pleaded guilty to driving under the influence. In 2022, he first spoke publicly about his past struggles with alcoholism, crediting his journey to sobriety with inspiring him to advocate for public policy that helps people in recovery.

Electoral history

References

External links 

 Official website
 Biography at King County

1971 births
Candidates in the 2022 United States House of Representatives elections
King County Councillors
Living people
Washington (state) lawyers
Washington (state) politicians convicted of crimes
Washington (state) Republicans